The Maury Mountains are a mountain range in Crook County, Oregon.  Much of the range is within the Ochoco National Forest.  Outstanding features of the range are the Maury Mountains Agate Beds and Antelope Flat Reservoir.

References 

Mountains of Crook County, Oregon
Mountain ranges of Oregon
Ochoco National Forest